Snow Capers is a 1948 short documentary film about winter sports in the Rocky Mountains directed by Arthur Cohen. It was nominated for an Oscar for Short Subjects, Two-Reel in the 21st Annual Academy Awards.

References

External links

1948 films
American black-and-white films
Documentary films about winter sports
1948 documentary films
Black-and-white documentary films
American short documentary films
1940s short documentary films
1948 short films
Rocky Mountains
1940s English-language films
1940s American films